Powerscourt is a closed railway siding located  east of Maffra, on the Maffra railway line in Victoria, Australia. The siding was used to load sugar beet.

History
In 1914, it was reported that Aboriginal bones were found while excavating at the siding, as well as stone axes and other similar materials. As of 1915, a weighbridge from Kilmany railway station was to be erected at the siding. An accident took place at the siding on 3 June 1919, where a horse carrying beet heading up to the siding slipped. The horse was not injured. As of 2005, the siding can still be seen with a "keen eye".

References

Railway sidings
Transport in Gippsland (region)
Shire of Wellington